The 47th annual Venice International Film Festival was held from 4 to 14 September 1990.

Jury
The following people comprised the 1990 jury:
Gore Vidal: head of jury
María Luisa Bemberg
Edoardo Bruno
Gilles Jacob
Kira Muratova
Omar Sharif
Ula Stöckl
Anna-Lena Wibom
Alberto Lattuada

Official selection

In competition

Out of competition
 , Czechoslovakia/Italy, directed by Juraj Jakubisko
  Henry and June, USA, directed by Philip Kaufman
  Romeo.Juliet, Belgium, directed by Armando Acosta
  Dick Tracy, USA, directed by Warren Beatty
  The Company of Strangers, Canada, directed by Cynthia Scott  
  Blood Oath, Australia, directed by Stephen Wallace
  Il y a des jours... et des lunes, France, directed by Claude Lelouch  
  , Italy, directed by Francesco Ranieri Martinotti, Rocco Mortelliti, Fulvio Ottaviano
  Dancin' Thru the Dark, UK, directed by Mike Ockrent
  Un week-end sur deux, France, directed by Nicole Garcia
  Shakha Proshakha, India, directed by Satyajit Ray

Autonomous sections

Venice International Film Critics' Week
The following feature films were selected to be screened as In Competition for this section:
 Boom Boom by Rosa Vergés (Spain)
 Cold Light of Day by Fiona Louise (United Kingdom)
 December (Dicembre) by Antonio Monda (Italy)
 La Discrète (en. The Discreet) by Christian Vincent (France)
 He’s Still There by Halfdan O. Hussie (United States)
 Under a Sky of Blue by Vitaliy Dudin (Soviet Union)
 The Station (La Stazione) by Sergio Rubini (Italy)
 Winckelmanns’s Travels (Winckelmanns Reisen) by Jan Schütte (West Germany)

Awards

Golden Lion:
Rosencrantz & Guildenstern Are Dead by Tom Stoppard
 Grand Special Jury Prize:
An Angel at My Table by Jane Campion
Silver Lion:
Best Director - Martin Scorsese (Goodfellas)
Best Screenplay - Helle Ryslinge (Sirup)
Silver Osella:
Best Cinematography - Marco Risi (Boys on the Outside)
Best Editing - Dominique Auvray (No Fear, No Die)
Best Original Music - Valeri Milovansky (The Only Witness)
Volpi Cup:
Best Actor - Oleg Borisov (The Only Witness)
Best Actress - Gloria Münchmeyer (The Moon in the Mirror)
The President of the Italian Senate's Gold Medal:
Raspad by Mikhail Belikov
Audience Award:
Martin Scorsese (Goodfellas)
Golden Ciak:
Best Film - Mr. and Mrs. Bridge by James Ivory
Best Actress - Marianne Sägebrecht (Martha and I)
FIPRESCI Prize:
Mathilukal by Adoor Gopalakrishnan
PREMIO LA NAVICELLA VENEZIA CINEMA:
The Only Witness by Michail Pandurski
OCIC Award:
An Angel at My Table by Jane Campion
OCIC Award - Honorable Mention:
I, the Worst of All (Yo, la peor de todas) by María Luisa Bemberg
UNICEF Award:
Mathilukal by Adoor Gopalakrishnan
Pasinetti Award:
Best Film - Mr. & Mrs. Bridge by James Ivory
Best Actor - Richard Dreyfuss (Rosencrantz & Guildenstern Are Dead)
Best Actress - Stefania Sandrelli (The African Woman)
Pietro Bianchi Award:
Ettore Scola
Little Golden Lion:
An Angel at My Table by Jane Campion
Elvira Notari Prize:
An Angel at My Table by Jane Campion
Bastone Bianco Award:
An Angel at My Table by Jane Campion
Goodfellas by Martin Scorsese
Bastone Bianco Award - Special Mention:
Mo' Better Blues by Spike Lee
Kodak-Cinecritica Award:
The Station (La stazione) by Sergio Rubini
UCCA Venticittà Award:
Cold Light of Day by Fhiona-Louise
UCCA Venticittà Award - Special Mention:
Under a Sky of Blue by Vitali Dudin

References

External links

Venice Film Festival 1990 Awards on IMDb

Venice Film Festival
Ven
1990 film festivals
Film
Venice
September 1990 events in Europe